Cooperstown Airport may refer to:

 Cooperstown Municipal Airport in Cooperstown, North Dakota, United States
 Cooperstown-Westville Airport in Cooperstown, New York, United States